Mandatory renewable energy targets are part of government legislated schemes which require electricity merchandisers to source-specific amounts of aggregate electricity sales from renewable energy sources according to a fixed time frame. The objective of these schemes is to promote renewable energy and decrease dependency on fossil fuels. If this results in an additional expenditure of electricity, the additional cost is distributed across most customers by increases in other tariffs. The cost of this measure is therefore not funded by the government budgets, except for costs of establishing and monitoring the scheme and any audit and enforcement actions. As the cost of renewable energy has become cheaper than other sources, meeting and exceeding a renewable energy target will also reduce the expenditure of electricity to consumers.

At least 67 countries have renewable energy policy targets of some kind. In Europe, 28 European Union members states and 8 Energy Community Contracting Parties have legally binding renewable energy targets. The EU baseline target is 20% by 2020, while the United States also has a national RET of 20%. Similarly, Canada has 9 provincial RETs but no national target for renewable energy (although it does have a 2030 non-emitting target and coal phase-out by 2030). Targets are typically for shares of electricity production, but some are defined as by primary energy supply, installed capacity, or otherwise. While some targets are based on 2010-2012 data, many are now for 2020, which bonds in with the IPCC suggested greenhouse gas emission cuts of 25 to 40% by Annex I countries by 2020, although some are for 2025.

Overview

Renewable energy technologies are essential contributors to the energy supply portfolio, as they contribute to world energy security, reduce dependency on fossil fuels, and provide opportunities for mitigating greenhouse gases. The International Energy Agency has defined three generations of renewable energy technologies, reaching back over 100 years:

First-generation technologies emerged from the industrial revolution at the end of the 19th century and include hydropower, biomass combustion, geothermal power and heat.  These technologies are quite widely used.
Second-generation technologies include solar heating and cooling, wind power, modern forms of bioenergy, and solar photovoltaics. These are now entering markets as a result of research, development and demonstration (RD&D) investments since the 1980s. Initial investment was prompted by energy security concerns linked to the oil crises  (1973 and 1979) of the 1970s but the enduring appeal of these technologies is due, at least in part, to environmental benefits.
Third-generation technologies are still under development and include advanced biomass gasification, biorefinery technologies, concentrating solar thermal power, hot-dry-rock geothermal power, and ocean energy.

First-generation technologies are well established. However, second-generation technologies and third-generation technologies  depend on further promotion by the public sector. The introduction of mandatory renewable energy targets is one important way in which governments can encourage the wider use of renewables.

Renewable energy targets exist in at least 66 countries around the world, including the 27 European Union countries, 29 U.S. states, and 9 Canadian provinces.  Most targets are for shares of electricity production, primary energy, and/or final energy for a future year.  Most targets aim for the 2010–2012 timeframe, although an increasing number of targets aim for 2020, and there is now an EU-wide target of 20% of final energy by 2020, and a Chinese target of 15% of primary energy by 2020.

Targets by country

Australia

In 2001, the federal government introduced a Mandatory Renewable Energy Target (MRET) of 9,500 GWh of new generation, with the scheme running until at least 2020. This represents an increase of new renewable electricity generation of about 4% of Australia's total electricity generation and a doubling of renewable generation from 1997 levels. Australia's renewable energy target does not cover heating or transport energy like Europe's or China's, Australia's target is therefore equivalent of approximately 5% of all energy from renewable sources.

An Expanded Renewable Energy Target was passed on 20 August 2009, to ensure that renewable energy obtains a 20% share of electricity supply in Australia by 2020. To ensure this, the Labor government committed that the MRET will increase from 9,500 gigawatt-hours to 45,000 gigawatt-hours by 2020. The scheme was to continue until 2030. After 2020, the proposed Emissions Trading Scheme and improved efficiencies from innovation and manufacture was expected to allow the MRET to be phased out by 2030. The target was criticised as unambitious and ineffective in reducing Australia's fossil fuel dependency, as it only applied to generated electricity, but not to the 77% of energy production exported, nor to energy sources which are not used for electricity generation, such as the oil used in transportation. Thus 20% renewable energy in electricity generation would represent less than 2% of total energy production in Australia.

In 2011 the 'expanded MRET' was split into two schemes: a Large-scale Renewable Energy Target (LRET) of 41,000 GWh for utility-scale renewable generators, and an uncapped Small-scale Renewable Energy Scheme for small household and commercial-scale generators. Following the 2014 Warburton Review initiated by the Abbott Government, and subsequent negotiations with the Labor Opposition, in June 2015 the LRET target was reduced to 33,000 GWh.

United States 

As of July 2010, 30 US states and DC have established mandatory renewable energy targets, and a further three have voluntary targets.
Of that,  shall be advanced biofuels (derived from feedstock other than corn starch). The remaining  shall come from biomass-based diesel and other advanced biofuels. For sources other than biofuels, The United States carries no mandatory renewable energy targets although they do support the growth of renewable energy industries with subsidies, feed-in tariffs, tax exemptions, and other financial support measures.

Renewable energy targets by region 
The European Union (EU) has a renewable energy target of 20% renewables target by 2020. This is followed by a more ambitious target of 35% renewable energy by 2030.

NAFTA (US, Canada and Mexico) has a 50% renewable energy sources target by 2025 in North America.

Latin America pledged 70% renewable energy by 2030.

The West African States (ECOWAS) aim for 38% renewable energy by 2030 achieved through the creation of 20GW of solar. The African Union also aims for a minimum of 10GW of renewable energy on the continent by 2030.

Table of renewable energy and targets

Overview

European countries

Other countries

See also

REN21
Centre for Energy and Environmental Markets
Clean Energy Future Group
Greenhouse Mafia
Greenhouse Solutions with Sustainable Energy
List of renewable energy topics by country

References

Renewable energy policy